The anthem of the Komi Republic is one of the official state symbols of the Komi Republic, a federal subject of Russia, along with its flag and coat of arms.

Origin
This anthem's melody is based on the melody of Viktor Savin's song "" ("The Falcon's Nest"), edited by the chairman of the Union of Composers of the Komi Republic, Mikhail Gertsman. It was edited by V. Timin into Komi, as amended by Alexandra Shergina and Alexander Suvorov in Russian.

History
The current text of the anthem was selected on a competitive basis between 2005 and 2006, where the participants were required to have an accurate version of Viktor Savin's song "Varyš pos" in the republic's two official state languages of Komi and Russian. As a result, Vladimir Timin's work was chosen in Komi, and Alexandra Shergina's work was chosen in Russian. However, when the anthem was being recorded, the phrase in her text "" ("Believe us, your destiny") turned out to be inconvenient for the performers, so it has been changed to "" ("Komi Krai"). Later the co-authorship of the Russian version was recognized; thus, the anthem was adopted by the State Council of the Komi Republic on 22 June 2006.

A new version of the anthem in both languages was first performed on 22 June 2006 by the State Song and Dance Ensemble named after V. Morozova "Asya Kya" at the V meeting of the 8th session of the State Council of the third convocation.

Law and regulation
Adopted in 1994, it was approved by the Law of the Republic of Komi dated 6 June 1994 No. XII-20/5 "On the State Anthem of the Republic of Komi". It is performed in Komi and Russian, the official languages of the Komi Republic.

Lyrics
The first two stanzas are in Komi, and the final two are in Russian.

Protocol
According to the Law, the anthem can be performed in orchestras, chorals, and in other vocal or instrumental performances. Cases of anthem performance have been identified, such as upon assuming office of the Head of the Komi Republic or the Chairman of the State Council, while the anthem is performed after the Russian national anthem. During public performances, those present while standing includes men without wearing any headwear. If the performance of the anthem is accompanied by the raising of the flag, those present turn to face it.

Notes

References

External links
http://www.nationalanthems.us/forum/YaBB.pl?num=1182159965

Komi Republic
Komi
Regional songs
Komi
National anthem compositions in G major